Feni Sadar is an upazila of Feni District in the Division of Chittagong, Bangladesh. The district headquarters and all other administrative offices are located here.

Geography
It has 57,331 households and a total area of 197.33 km2.

Demographics
According to the 1991 Bangladesh census, the upazila of Feni Sadar had a population of 345,801 of whom 165,969 were aged 18 or older. Males constituted 51.15% of the population, and females 48.85%. Feni Sadar had an average literacy rate of 43.2% (7+ years), against the national average of 32.4%.

Administration
Feni Sadar Upazila is divided into Feni Municipality and 12 union parishads: Baligaon, Chonua, Dholia, Dhormapur, Fazilpur, Forhadnogor, Kalidah, Kazirbag, Lemua, Motobi, Panchgachia, and Sarishadi. The union parishads are subdivided into 134 mauzas and 125 villages.

Feni Municipality is subdivided into 18 wards and 35 mahallas.

Notable people
Khawaja Ahmed, member of the 1st Bangladeshi Parliament

See also
 Upazilas of Bangladesh
 Districts of Bangladesh
 Divisions of Bangladesh

References

Upazilas of Feni District